Kaim may refer to:

Anglicization of the punjabi community(Caste) Kaim ("riser")
Kaimganj, a town in the Indian state of Uttar Pradesh
People with the surname Kaim:
Barbara Kaim (born 1952), Polish archaeologist
Konrad Valentin von Kaim (1737–1801), Habsburg general during the French Revolutionary Wars
Ignatius Gottfried Kaim (1746–1778), Austrian chemist
Peter Kaim-Caudle (1916–2010), German-born British social policy professor
Wolfgang Kaim (born 1951), German chemist
Radosław Kaim (born 1973), Polish actor
Khaled Kaim, Libyan politician